Ruth Porat (born 1957) is a British–American business executive serving as chief financial officer of Alphabet and its subsidiary Google since 2015.

In 2020, Porat was listed as the 16th most powerful woman in the world by Forbes,<ref name="Forbes 2020 Most Powerful Women"; and seventh on Fortune Most Powerful Women list in 2020.

Early life and education 
Porat was born to a Jewish family in Sale, Cheshire, England, the daughter of Dr. Dan and Frieda Porat. Her mother was born in Israel and her father moved there as an adolescent and fought in the 1948 Arab–Israeli War. She also has a brother, Marc Porat, who founded General Magic. Porat moved at a young age to Cambridge, Massachusetts, where her father was a research fellow in the physics department at Harvard University. Her father three years later relocated the family to Palo Alto, California, where he worked at the SLAC National Accelerator Laboratory for 26 years. Porat holds a B.A. in economics and international relations from Stanford University, an M.Sc. in industrial relations from the London School of Economics, and an M.B.A. with distinction from the Wharton School of the University of Pennsylvania.

Career

Morgan Stanley 
Porat began her career at Morgan Stanley in 1987 and left in 1993 to follow Morgan Stanley president Robert F. Greenhill to Smith Barney and returned to Morgan Stanley in 1996. Before becoming CFO, she served as vice chairman of investment banking from September 2003 to December 2009 and the global head of the Financial Institutions Group from September 2006 to December 2009. She was previously co-head of technology investment banking and worked for Morgan Stanley in London. While a banker at Morgan Stanley, she was credited with creating the European debt financing that saved Amazon from collapse during the dot-com melt down in 2000. Her financial partner during the Dot-com bubble was Mary Meeker, the godmother to Porat's three children.  In a 2014, Politico published an articled titled "Porat: The Most Powerful Woman On Wall Street".

During the financial crisis, Porat led the Morgan Stanley team advising the United States Department of the Treasury regarding Fannie Mae and Freddie Mac, and the New York Federal Reserve Bank with respect to AIG.  In May 2011, she presented to the Bretton Woods Committee hosted by the International Monetary Fund in Washington, D.C., on post-crisis reform and financial legislation, and to the World Economic Forum in Davos in 2013 on "trust" levels within and of the financial sector.

In 2013, it was reported that President Barack Obama would nominate Porat as the next Deputy Secretary of the Treasury. However, it was reported later by Bloomberg News and The New York Times that Porat had contacted White House officials to withdraw her name from consideration because of improving conditions at Morgan Stanley and the acrimonious confirmation process inflicted upon then Treasury Secretary-nominee Jack Lew.

Porat's career was analyzed in the McKinsey & Company study "How Remarkable Women Lead".  She was named "Best Financial Institutions CFO" in a poll conducted by Institutional Investor for its "2014 All-America Executive Team".

Google 
On March 24, 2015, it was announced that Porat would join Google as its new CFO as of May 26, 2015. Bloomberg Business reported that her hiring deal amounted to $70 million. She has been credited with boosting Google's share price by reorganizing the company and imposing financial discipline.  For the "2018 All America Executive Team", she was named "Best Internet CFO" by Institutional Investor. Porat spoke at the Fortune Most Powerful Women Summit in Dana Point, California, on October 19, 2016, in her capacity as CFO of Alphabet Inc. and Google.  At Google, in addition to Finance, Porat also has Business Operations, Real Estate and Work Place Services reporting to her. She was paid $50 million in 2020, $47 million in 2018, $688,000 in 2017, and $39 million in 2016

Board membership 

She is a member of the Board of Directors of Stanford University Management Company, the University's endowment, the Board of Trustees of Memorial Sloan Kettering Cancer Center, the Board of Directors of The Council on Foreign Relations, the Board of Directors of Bloomberg Philanthropies, and the Board of Directors of The Blackstone Group.  She previously served on the Board of Trustees of Stanford University, the Borrowing Advisory Committee of the United States Treasury, and the Board of Trustees of the Economic Club of New York. She is a member of the Advisory Council of the Hutchins Center on Fiscal and Monetary Policy at the Brookings Institution, and the Economic Strategy Group at the Aspen Institute.

Political views 
Porat supported Hillary Clinton for president in 2008, hosting a fundraiser in New York City, and did the same in 2016.

In 2011, Porat expressed her support for increased taxes on the wealthy and declared on the topic of significant spending decreases that "we cannot cut our way to greatness".

Personal life 
Porat has been married to Anthony Paduano, a partner in the law firm Paduano & Weintraub, since 1983. Porat is a survivor of breast cancer.

In September 2015, Porat reportedly paid $30 million for a house in Palo Alto.  In 2016, she gave the commencement address for graduates of the Wharton School.

In popular culture 
In the 2011 HBO movie Too Big to Fail, Porat is played by Jennifer van Dyck.

References 

1957 births
Living people
American chief financial officers
American financial businesspeople
American people of English-Jewish descent
American women business executives
British emigrants to the United States
Alumni of the London School of Economics
Stanford University alumni
Directors of Morgan Stanley
Morgan Stanley employees
Google employees
Alphabet Inc. people
Women chief financial officers
Women financial analysts
Stanford University trustees
21st-century American women